Boba Fett is a fictional character from the Star Wars franchise.

Boba Fett or Bobafett may also refer to:

Music
 Boba Fett, a nickname of Swedish rock musician Anders Lindström
 Boba Fett, a former name of the British rock band Tokyo Adventures
 Bobafett, a bass guitarist featured on the 2002 album Bermuda Triangle

Literature
 Boba Fett: Twin Engines of Destruction (comic book) a 2000 one-shot Star Wars comic book from Dark Horse comics starring the eponymous Star Wars character
 Star Wars: Boba Fett (series of comic book series), a series of 5 comic book series, each of multiple volumes, from the 1990s through the 2000s, starring the bounty hunter
 Star Wars: Boba Fett (novel series), a series of 6 Star Wars novels published in the mid-2000s, starring the bounty hunter
 Boba Fett: A Practical Man (novella), a 2006 Star Wars novella by Karen Traviss, starring the eponymous bounty hunter
 The Tale of Boba Fett: The Last One Standing (short story), a 1996 Star Wars short story starring the bounty hunter
 The Tale of Boba Fett: A Barve Like That (short story), a 1995 Star Wars short story starring the bounty hunter

Other uses
 Jango Fett, a character in Star Wars
Clone trooper, fictional soldiers featured in Star Wars who, like Boba Fett, are cloned from Jango Fett
 The Book of Boba Fett, a Star Wars TV series

See also